Daniele Luttazzi (born Daniele Fabbri on 26 January 1961) is an Italian theater actor, writer, satirist, illustrator and singer. His stage name is an homage to musician and actor Lelio Luttazzi. His favourite topics are politics, religion, sex and death.

Biography 

Luttazzi was born in Santarcangelo di Romagna, province of Rimini. He began his comic career performing satirical monologues in theatre shows and writing comedy books.
In 1988, his monologue won an award in a comedy contest held at Rome's Teatro Sistina.
From 1989, he began working in TV variety shows: Fate il vostro gioco (1989, Rai 2), Banane (1989, Telemontecarlo), Magazine 3 (1993, 1994, Rai 3), Mai Dire Gol (1996, 1997, Italia 1).
In 1998, he hosts his own late night show, Barracuda (Italia 1). Luttazzi did monologues about recent news, interviews with famous showbiz and political personalities, and skits for adult audiences. The same formula was then adopted for his next TV show, called Satyricon, aired by the public channel Rai 2 in 2001. In March 2001, Luttazzi interviewed journalist Marco Travaglio about "L'odore dei soldi" (The Scent of Money), a book on the mysterious origins of Silvio Berlusconi's wealth: bank Rasini, a bank largely used by Italian mafia for money laundering. The next year, shortly after Berlusconi's statement on the "criminal use of public television" made by Luttazzi (see Editto Bulgaro), Luttazzi's show was cancelled by RAI's management. Since then, Luttazzi has been often cited by the European press (i.e. The Economist, Le Monde, El País) as proof of Mr. Berlusconi's censorship of the opposition.

After television, Luttazzi toured Italy doing theatre shows and wrote books. He returned on TV in 2007 with the new satirical program "Decameron: Politica, Sesso, Religione e Morte" (Decameron: Politics, Sex, Religion and Death) for the private channel La7. Eventually his show was suspended after a controversial joke on journalist Giuliano Ferrara (who was working for La7 too).
2012: Luttazzi wins his legal battle against La7. La7 shall pay Luttazzi 1 million 2 hundred thousand euros.

In 2009 he opens a satire gym on his blog. The authors of Lercio.it are trained at his school.

Allegations of plagiarism 
In 1994, Susanna Tamaro, bestselling author of "Va' dove ti porta il cuore", sued Luttazzi for plagiarism after his parody "Va' dove ti porta il clito". Luttazzi won the trial: it was ruled a parody, not plagiarism.

Since then, Luttazzi has been further accused of plagiarism. In 2001 the Italian progressive newspaper La Repubblica noticed the similarities between Luttazzi TV show Barracuda and the David Letterman Show. Luttazzi replied that the actual model of David Letterman is, in turn, Johnny Carson's Tonight Show and stated that all jokes and texts were original.  In 2007, Christian Rocca, a journalist from "Il Foglio" (a conservative newspaper controlled by Silvio Berlusconi's family)  accused Luttazzi of plagiarizing jokes from American comedians; and in 2010 several Italian newspapers reported of anonymous bloggers accusing him of having plagiarised many jokes from comedians such as George Carlin, Mitch Hedberg, Eddie Izzard, Chris Rock, Bill Hicks and Robert Schimmel.  The accusation of plagiarism, according to Luttazzi, is a misleading half-truth. Five years before those allegations, Luttazzi himself told about his scheme on his personal blog: he wrote that he adds famous comedians' material to his work as a defense against the million-euro lawsuits he has to face because of his satire. Luttazzi calls his ruse "the Lenny Bruce trick" after a similar trick played by his hero, Lenny Bruce.  Luttazzi asks his readers to find out the original jokes. He awards a prize to anyone who finds a "nugget", i.e. a reference to famous jokes: he calls the game "treasure hunt". Luttazzi also calls the allegations "naive", explaining why those jokes are not "plagiarized", but "calqued", which is a fair use of original material. He used a joke by Emo Philips to prove that the meaning of a joke depends on its context.  Luttazzi's blog lists all the comedians and writers quoted in his works.

In 2012, Luttazzi won the first step of a legal battle against La7 broadcasting company, which in 2007 abruptly closed his late show "Decameron", accusing him, among other charges, of plagiarism from Bill Hicks. La7 was sentenced to pay 1,200,000 Euros as compensation. In 2014, an academic paper explained why Luttazzi's jokes are his own and not "plagiarised" ones.

Reactions 
In 2010, a few commentators, after the first batch of news which did not mention Luttazzi's 2005 post in his blog about the "Lenny Bruce trick", said Luttazzi did what web aggregators do. Others, such as Wu Ming, pointed out that as a result, many former fans were turning into angered detractors of Luttazzi, with the risk of denying Luttazzi's original artistic and cultural contributions and deep renovation of Italian satire.
In Luttazzi's defense, film director Roberto Faenza quoted Roberto Benigni: Benigni compares Luttazzi's copying to the greatest artists' copying, writers like Virgil, Ovid, Dante, Shakespeare, Buster Keaton, Eduardo De Filippo, and Woody Allen.

Works

Books 
 101 cose da evitare a un funerale, Modena, Comix, 1993. 
 Locuste. Come le formiche, solo più cattive, Modena, Comix, 1994.  Le 101 locuste sono poi state incluse nelle prime edizioni di CRAMPO
 Sesso con Luttazzi, Modena, Comix, 1994. ; Milano, Mondadori, 2000. 
 Adenoidi, Milano, Bompiani, 1995. ; Milano, Rizzoli, 1999. 
 Va' dove ti porta il clito, Modena, Comix, 1995. ; 1996. 
 C.R.A.M.P.O. Corso Rapido di Apprendimento Minimo per Ottenebrati, Modena, Comix, 1996.  Le prime edizioni contenevano in appendice Locuste
 Gioventù Cannibale, con altri, Torino, Einaudi, 1996. 
 Tabloid", Modena, Comix, 1997. ; 1997. 
 Teatro. Rettili & roditori, Scene da un adulterio, Modena, Comix, 1998. 
 Cosmico! Una valida alternativa all'intrattenimento intelligente, Milano, Mondadori, 1998. 
 Barracuda, Milano, Mondadori, 1999. 
 Luttazzi Satyricon, Milano, Mondadori, 2001. 
 Benvenuti in Italia, Milano, Feltrinelli, 2002. 
 Capolavori, Milano, Feltrinelli, 2002. 
 La castrazione e altri metodi infallibili per prevenire l'acne, Milano, Feltrinelli, 2003. 
 Bollito misto con mostarda, Milano, Feltrinelli, 2005.  include I giardini dell'epistassi Lepidezze postribolari, ovvero Populorum progressio, Milano, Feltrinelli, 2007. 
 La guerra civile fredda, Milano, Feltrinelli, 2009. 
 La quarta necessità, (disegni di Massimo Giacon), Milano, Rizzoli, 2011. 
 Lolito. Una parodia, Roma, Il Fatto Quotidiano, 2013; Milano, Chiarelettere, 2013. 
 Bloom Porno-Teo-Kolossal, Roma, Il Fatto Quotidiano, 2015.

 Translations and prefaces 
 Translation of Daniel Clowes, L'antologia ufficiale di Lloyd LLewellyn, Bologna, Telemaco, 1992.
 Introduction to Francesca Ghermandi, Hiawata Pete, Bologna, Granata Press, 1993. Nuova edizione: Coconino Press, 2008. 
 Preface to Daniele Brolli e Roberto Baldazzini, Trans/Est, Bologna, Phoenix, 1994.
 Preface to Lenny Bruce, Come parlare sporco e influenzare la gente, Milano, Bompiani, 1995. 
 Preface to Massimo Giacon, Sexorcismo 2000, Roma, Mare Nero, 2000. 
 Translation and introduction to Woody Allen, Effetti collaterali, Milano, Tascabili Bompiani, 2004. 
  Translation and introduction to Woody Allen, Senza piume, Milano, Tascabili Bompiani, 2004. 
  Translation and introduction to Woody Allen Rivincite, Milano, Tascabili Bompiani, 2004. 
 Introduction to Stan Lee e John Romita Sr., The complete Spider-Man, vol. II, 29/1/1979-11/1/1981, Modena, Panini comics, 2007. 

 Music 

 2005 – Money for Dope (EMI)
 2007 – School Is Boring (EDEL)

 Tv programs 

 Fate il vostro gioco, 1989 – Rai 2
 Banane, 1990 – TMC
 Magazine 3, 1994–95 – Rai 3
 Mai dire gol, 1995–98 – Italia 1
 Barracuda, 1998–99 – Italia 1
 Satyricon, 2001 – Rai 2
 Decameron, 2007 – La7

 Theatrical monologues 

 Non qui, Barbara, nessuno ci sta guardando (1989)
Oggi in tutta la mia casa c'è uno splendore nuovo (1990)
 Chi ha paura di Daniele Luttazzi? (1991)
 Sesso con Luttazzi (1993, 1999, 2003, 2008)
 Va' dove ti porta il clito (1995, 2009)
 Adenoidi (1996)
 Tabloid (1997)
 Barracuda LIVE (1998)
 Satyricon (2001)
 Adenoidi 2003 (2003)
 Dialoghi platonici (2003) (recitati da attori dello Stabile di Genova e dell'Archivolto, per la regia di Giorgio Gallione)
 Bollito misto con mostarda (2004)
 Come uccidere causando inutili sofferenze (2005)
 Barracuda 2007 (2007)
 Decameron (2008)

 Music concerts 
 Songbook'' (2009)

References

External links 
 Official site with blog

1961 births
Living people
People from Santarcangelo di Romagna
Italian male writers
Italian stand-up comedians
Italian satirists
People involved in plagiarism controversies
Kabarettists